Ballader och oförskämdheter (English: Ballads and impertinencies) is the debut studio album by Swedish-Dutch folk singer-songwriter Cornelis Vreeswijk. Initially, Vreeswijk's songs were about to be sung by his friend Fred Åkerström, who introduced him to the label Metronom; it was, however, decided that Cornelis Vreeswijk should sing the songs on his own. The album was a success and a good start of his career.

Track listing
Songs have links to their lyrics on external site 

 Ballad på en soptipp - 2:41
 Visa i vinden - 2:46
 Halleluja, jag är frisk igen - 1:41
 Lillsysterns undulat är död - 1:30
 Ann-Katarin - 3:25
 Häst-på-taket-William - 2:03
 Tältet - 2:19
 På grund av emigration - 2:45
 Min polare Per - 2:15
 Balladen om all kärleks lön - 2:02
 Balladen om Fredrik Åkare - 2:26
 Perfect time killer - 2:33
 Vaggvisa" - 2:43

Personnel
Cornelis Vreeswijk - vocal, acoustic guitar

References

Cornelis Vreeswijk albums
1964 debut albums
Swedish-language albums